The politics of South Tyrol is conducted through a parliamentary, democratic autonomous province with a multi-party system. Executive power is exercised collectively by the Landesregierung, which is led by the Governor, referred to as "Landeshauptmann" in German. Legislative power is vested in the Landtag primarily, and secondarily on the provincial government. The judiciary is independent of the executive and the legislative branches. South Tyrol has been an autonomous province within the Italian Republic since 1948, when the Gruber – De Gasperi Agreement was agreed upon between Austria and Italy.

The current Landeshauptmann is Arno Kompatscher.

Provincial government 

The local government system is based upon the provisions of the Italian Constitution and the Autonomy Statute of the Region Trentino-Alto Adige/Südtirol. The 1972 second Statute of Autonomy for Trentino-Alto Adige/Südtirol devolved most legislative and executive competences from the regional level to the provincial level, creating de facto two separate regions.

The executive powers are attributed to the provincial government (German: Landesregierung; Italian: Giunta Provinciale) headed by the Landeshauptmann Arno Kompatscher, who has been in power since 2014. He belongs to the South Tyrolean People's Party.

List of governors

Provincial council 

The considerable legislative power of the province is vested in a provincial assembly called Landtag (German: Südtiroler Landtag; Italian: Consiglio della Provincia Autonoma di Bolzano; Ladin: Cunsëi dla Provinzia Autonoma de Bulsan).
The legislative powers of the assembly cover all those subject matters that are not expressly reserved to the exclusive legislative power of the Italian State or to concurrent legislation per article 117 of the Italian Constitution.

Last provincial elections

Political parties and elections 

The independence controversy is especially an issue of the German parties Die Freiheitlichen, South Tyrolean Freedom and Union for South Tyrol. With the 2008 Kosovo declaration of independence, the idea of a Freistaat (free state) resurfaced again. Eva Klotz and her party South Tyrolean Freedom, which launched the campaign South Tyrol is not Italy!, are among the strongest advocates of self-determination.

During the 2008 regional elections, the incumbent South Tyrolean People's Party lost votes to her party, the regionalist Lega Nord Alto Adige – Südtirol and Die Freiheitlichen, who have close ties to the nationalist Freedom Party of Austria.

Autonomy issues
The Südtiroler Heimatbund asked the Soffi-Institute in Innsbruck to conduct an opinion poll on the future of South Tyrol. The poll was conducted at the end of 2005 in which only German-speaking South Tyroleans were asked. 45.33% of those asked were in favour of remaining with Italy, 54.67% were against remaining. The latter group comprised 33.40% in favour of an independent state and 21.27% in favour of Tyrolean reunification with Austria.

Another poll conducted in August 2008 by the apollis Institute of Social Research and Opinion Polling in Bolzano asked 502 Italian-speaking South Tyroleans of their opinion. The poll consisted of three parts. To the first question if a referendum about remaining with Italy should be held at all, 41% said yes and 59% no.
In the event of a referendum, 78% wished to remain with Italy, 20% were in favour of an independent state and 2% in favour of Tyrolean reunification with Austria.

A poll conducted in 2013 among German and Ladin speakers by the Austrian Kasmarin agency showed the following results: To the question "If a referendum were conducted also in South Tyrol and you had a choice, how would you decide?", 26% would opt for staying within Italy, and 54% for independence from Italy.

Across the border in the Austrian state of Tyrol, the Tiroler Tageszeitung conducted a poll in January 2009 to gauge the opinion of the inhabitants of North and East Tyrol. 500 people were asked in the poll. In 2008, 45% wished a reunification with South Tyrol, that number increased in 2009 by 4% to 49% in favour. 36.6% were against reunification while 14.1% had no opinion.
In the age group of 15- to 29-year-olds, 71% were in favour of reunification. The highest support by district was in the Oberland with 67% while Innsbruck city and district was lowest with 42%.

Further reading 

 Marc Röggla. 2019. "Consensus Impossible? South Tyrol’s Autonomy Convention and the issue of Self-determination." Journal of Autonomy and Security Studies

References